Events from the year 1549 in India.

Events
 Sher Shah Suri's tomb Chinshjh is constructed in Sasaram

Births
 Thomas Stephens, linguist and missionary to Portuguese India is born in Wiltshire, England (dies 1619)

Deaths

See also

 Timeline of Indian history

References

See also
 Timeline of Indian history